Professor Christopher (Kit) Kelen  (born 17 December 1958 in Sydney) is an Australian academic, writer, and artist. He is the younger son of Hungarian-born writer Stephen Kelen.

Kelen is the author of fourteen volumes of poetry and two novels. He has been published widely since the mid-1970s and in 1988 won an ABA/ABC bicentennial award with his poem "Views from Pinchgut".
	
In 1992, "The Naming of the Harbour and the Trees" won an Anne Elder Award. Kelen was Writer-in-Residence for the Australia Council at the B. R. Whiting Library in Rome in 1996.

For many years, Kelen taught Creative Writing and Literature at the University of Macau. As of 2020, he lived in Sydney.

Kelen has published several book-length scholarly works about poetry, including Poetry, Consciousness and Community (2009), City of Poets (2009), and Anthem Quality (2014).

Kelen was elected a Fellow of the Royal Society of New South Wales in 2019.

Bibliography 
Poetry
The Naming of the Harbour and the Trees (1992)
Green Lizard Manifesto (1997)
Möbius (1998)
Republics (2000)
New Territories (2003)
Eight Days in Lhasa (2006)
A Map of the Seasons (2006)
Dredging the Delta (2007)
After Meng Jiao  (2008)
China Years (2011)
Pictures of Nothing at All (2014)
Scavengers' Season (2014)
As to the Ladders of Whichway (2015)
A Pocket Kit (2) (2015)
Poor Man's Coat (2018)

Novels
Punk's Travels (1980)
A Wager with the Gods (2006)

References 

1958 births
20th-century Australian novelists
21st-century Australian novelists
Australian expatriates in China
Australian male novelists
Australian poets
University of Sydney alumni
Living people
Western Sydney University alumni
Australian male poets
20th-century Australian male writers
21st-century Australian male writers
Fellows of the Royal Society of New South Wales